Cremona is a 1996  album by Italian singer Mina.
The album title is a tribute to her city of origin, Cremona.

Track listing 

 Meglio così—5:17
 Dottore—5:29
 Succede—5:37
 Musica per lui—3:48
 La bacchetta magica—4:03
 Ricominciamo—4:09
 Boh!—5:17
 Io sarò con te—5:03
 Volami nel cuore—3:39
 Ma tu ci pensi—4:22

1996 albums
Mina (Italian singer) albums